Olvi plc is a Finnish brewery and soft drinks company founded in 1878. It currently holds 18.7% of Finland's market share in beverages, making it the largest Finnish-owned business in its sector. Among its subsidiaries, A. Le Coq is the second largest beverage company in Estonia and Volfas Engelman is the third largest beverage company in Lithuania. Olvi also has businesses in Latvia (Cēsu Alus) and Belarus (Lidskаe Pivа). In May 2021, Olvi bought a controlling stake in Denmark's fourth largest brewery A/S Bryggeriet Vestfyen. After the Russian invasion of Ukraine on March 5, 2022, Olvi announced that it was ceasing exports to Russia and leaving Belarus.

Beers 
Olvi (Ykkönen, III, Export, Tuplapukki, HALKO)
Sandels (III, IV A, Tumma, Special Edition)
A. Le Coq (Premium, Porter, Gold, Pils, Alexander)
Cēsu alus
Ragutis
Starobrno (license)
Warsteiner (license)
Pirkka III-OLUT

Ciders 
Fizz (Original Dry, Extra dry)
Sherwood Premium Cider

Long drinks 
Olvi-lonkerot (granberry, mojito, kultalonkero)
GIN Long Drink

Soft drinks 
Kane's Soda Pop (Chula Vista Crush, Pasadena Pinch...)
Olvi soft drinks (Jaffa, cola, lemon...)
TEHO (energy drink)
Motor oil (energy drink)
KevytOlo (Mineral waters: Lähdevesi, Raikas, Karpalo, Mansikka-Sitruuna, Mustaherukka, Päärynä, Sitruuna, Vihreä Omena, Vadelma+Kalsium, Sitruuna mehukivennäisvesi, Makea Ananas, Makea Kuningatar)

See also
 Beer in Belarus

References

External links

 

Breweries in Finland
Food and drink companies established in 1878
Companies listed on Nasdaq Helsinki